Tine is a 1964 Danish drama film directed by Knud Leif Thomsen. It was entered into the 4th Moscow International Film Festival.

Cast
 Lone Hertz as Tine Bølling
 Jørgen Reenberg as Skovrider Berg
 Birgitte Federspiel as Fru Berg
 Ellen Gottschalch as Madam Bølling
 Johannes Meyer as Hr. Bølling
 Grethe Thordahl as Sofie
 Marie-Louise Coninck as Maren
 Tove Wisborg as Tinka
 Palle Huld as Baron Staub
 Einar Juhl as Provsten
 John Price as Krigskorrespondenten
 Holger Juul Hansen as Løvenhjelm

References

External links
 

1964 films
1964 drama films
Danish drama films
1960s Danish-language films
Danish black-and-white films
Films based on Danish novels
Films based on works by Herman Bang
Films directed by Knud Leif Thomsen